Marcela Silvia Carena Lopez (born 22 March 1962) is a theoretical physicist, and Distinguished Scientist at the Fermi National Accelerator Laboratory in Batavia, Illinois, where she is also head of the lab's Theory Division. She is also a professor at the University of Chicago, where she is a member of the Enrico Fermi Institute and the Kavli Institute for Cosmological Physics.

Early life and education 

Marcela Carena was born on 22 March 1962 in Buenos Aires, Argentina, and grew up in the Villa Urquiza neighborhood. An only child, her father was an Italian immigrant who had immigrated to Argentina in the early 20th century, and her mother came from a Spanish family who had previously immigrated to Argentina.   

Carena initially studied engineering at the Instituto Tecnológico de Buenos Aires, then studied philosophy at the University of Buenos Aires, and finally received her diploma in physics from the Instituto Balseiro in Bariloche, Argentina in 1985. That same year, at the encouragement of Robert Peccei, Carena and her husband, Carlos Wagner, were offered positions at the University of Hamburg and at the DESY Laboratory in Hamburg, Germany. Carena received her PhD in high energy physics from the University of Hamburg in 1989.

Career 
After the completion of her PhD, Carena began a postdoctoral appointment at Purdue University in West Lafayette, Indiana, where she worked with William Bardeen. She then returned to Germany for another postdoc position at the Max Planck Institute for Physics in Munich, Germany. In 1993, she went to CERN in Geneva, Switzerland, for another postdoc position.

After three years at CERN, Carena was hired by Fermilab in an associate scientist position, and was later promoted to a full tenured scientist role. At Fermilab, Carena originated a visitor program which brings students from Latin America to Fermilab so that they can pursue research projects with Fermilab theoretical physicists as part of their graduate education. In 2008, she began a formal teaching position at the University of Chicago.

Carena was a general councilor of the American Physical Society (APS); chair of the Division of Particle and Fields of APS; and a member of the APS Committee on International Scientific Affairs. She is a former chair of the DPF Nominating Committee. She served on the Particle Physics Project Prioritization Panel (P5) of the U.S. DOE/NSF High Energy Physics Advisory Panel (HEPAP). From 2004 through 2019, Carena was a member of the Aspen Center for Physics. In 2021 she was appointed as a member of the Argentinian Academy of Exact, Physical, and Natural Sciences.

Carena frequently delivers public lectures. She was featured in the 2008 documentary film The Atom Smashers.

Research 

Carena's research is focused on models of new physics beyond the Standard Model and their manifestations in particle physics experiments, including on topics such as Higgs physics, supersymmetry, unification, and dark matter.

Awards 

 John Stuart Bell Fellow at CERN, 1993-95
 Marie Curie Fellow, 1996
 American Physical Society Fellow since 2002
 Research Award from the Alexander von Humboldt Foundation, 2013
 Simons Distinguished Visiting Scholar at the Kavli Institute for Theoretical Physics, 2013

Personal life 

Carena married theoretical physicist Carlos E.M. Wagner in 1985. They have two children.

Publications

 Dr. Carena's publications on the INSPIRE-HEP Literature Database .
 Articles by Marcela Carena in Scientific American

References

External links
Oral history interview transcript with Marcela Carena on 3 March 2021, American Institute of Physics, Niels Bohr Library & Archives
Dr. Carena's website at Fermilab
 Fermilab Theory Division homepage
Fermilab Program for Latin American Students
The Atom Smashers
MSNBC : Women explore the frontiers of physics 
Profile in Science (AAAS), From Buenos Aires to Bosons
Scientific publications of Marcela Carena on INSPIRE-HEP

1962 births

Living people
Argentine physicists
Particle physicists
Theoretical physicists
Fellows of the American Physical Society
People associated with CERN
People associated with Fermilab
Women physicists
University of Hamburg alumni
University of Chicago faculty